The Heard County School District is a public school district in Heard County, Georgia, United States, based in Franklin. It serves the communities of Centralhatchee, Corinth, Ephesus, Franklin, Glenn, and Houston.

Schools
The Heard County School District has three elementary schools, one middle school, and one high school.

Elementary schools 
Centralhatchee Elementary School
Ephesus Elementary School
Heard Elementary School

Middle school
Heard County Middle School

High school
Heard County High School

References

External links
Heard County School District

School districts in Georgia (U.S. state)
Education in Heard County, Georgia